The 2018–19 BIBL season is the 11th edition of Balkan International Basketball League (BIBL). The competition started on 16 October 2018.

Competition format 
Originally eight teams joined the competition, but Prishtina 2019 withdrew its participation in January due to the commitment in the FIBA Europe Cup.

The remaining seven teams play a round robin tournament where each team faced the others in home and away games. The top four teams qualify directly for the Final Four.

Regular season

Final Four 
The BIBL Final Four is the final stage of the competition that follows the regular season.

Semifinals

Third place

Final

References

External links 
 

BIBL seasons